Olivier Renard (born 24 May 1979) is a retired Belgian football goalkeeper and is currently working as Sporting Director for the Montreal Impact.

Career
He was transferred in January 2008 from Standard Liège. He has also represented his country in the national football team and was a part of the Belgian team in the 1997 FIFA World Youth Championship and he played at the UEFA European Under-21 Football Championship in 2000 and 2002 where he was backup goalie to Jean-François Gillet. In the 2007–2008 season he finished second in the Goalkeeper of the year award, next to youngster Kenny Steppe.

Management career
From January 2014, Renard joined KV Mechelen as sporting director. He left the club in February 2016, to join Standard Liège, still as sporting director. From the summer 2018, he became the head of scouting instead of sporting director. He left the club by mutual consent on 20 May 2019.

In June 2019, he was hired as a sports consultant at Royal Antwerp. He left the club again on 29 September 2019, where it was announced that Renard had signed with Major League Soccer (MLS) club Montreal Impact, now CF Montréal, as the sporting director.

On June 9th 2022, CF Montreal elevated Olivier Renard to vice president and chief sporting officer in a new agreement for an indefinite period. Rather than signing a new contract, Renard was made a permanent employee of the club.

References

External links 
Guardian Football

1979 births
Association football goalkeepers
Belgian expatriate footballers
Belgian Pro League players
Belgian footballers
Belgium under-21 international footballers
Belgium youth international footballers
Expatriate footballers in Italy
K.V. Mechelen players
Living people
Modena F.C. players
People from La Louvière
R. Charleroi S.C. players
S.S.C. Napoli players
Serie B players
Standard Liège players
Udinese Calcio players
Footballers from Hainaut (province)